Tragiscoschema is a genus of longhorn beetles of the subfamily Lamiinae, containing the following species:

 Tragiscoschema amabile (Perroud, 1855)
 Tragiscoschema bertolonii (Thomson, 1857)
 Tragiscoschema cor-flavum Fiedler, 1939
 Tragiscoschema elegantissimum Breuning, 1934
 Tragiscoschema holdhausi Itzinger, 1934
 Tragiscoschema inermis Aurivillius, 1908
 Tragiscoschema nigroscriptum (Fairmaire, 1897)

References

Tragocephalini
Cerambycidae genera